Events in the year 1926 in Spain.

Incumbents
Monarch: Alfonso XIII
President of the Council of Ministers: Miguel Primo de Rivera

Births
January 1 - José Manuel Estepa Llaurens, cardinal (d. 2019)
March 18 - Ángel Peralta Pineda, rejoneador and actor (d. 2018)
April 25 -  Manuel Clavero, lawyer and politician.(d. 2021). 
November 18 - Estanislau Basora, footballer (d. 2012).

Deaths

June 10 - Antoni Gaudí, architect (d. 1852).

References

 
Years of the 20th century in Spain
1920s in Spain
Spain
Spain